Al-Khamis al-Wast is a sub-district located in Habur Zulaymah District, 'Amran Governorate, Yemen. Al-Khamis al-Wast had a population of 12123 according to the 2004 census.

References 

Sub-districts in Habur Zulaymah District